Toutens (Occitan: Totens) is a commune in the Haute-Garonne department in the Occitanie region in Southwestern France. In 2018, it had a population of 345. Its inhabitants are called Toutensois (masculine) and Toutensoises (feminine).

History
Toutens was originally a "seigneurie" or Lord of the Manor. In turn this lordship was originally a dependency of the barony of Beauville. It was detached in favour of the De Ver family in 1463 whose descendants by marriage, the De Puybusque, became the Marquises of Toutens.  The De Ver family had lived in a château in Toutens since before the mid-16th century, certainly before 1554 and possibly 1503 or even earlier. Then the Marquis de Toutens were more plainly styled the Seigneur de Toutens, feudal lords with considerable rights to collect income and levy justice in their fiefdom.

Then on 28 June 1580, during the French Wars of Religion, the Vicomte de Turenne, a friend and ally of the future King Henry IV of France, led a Protestant (Huguenot) army and attacked several châteaux and forts in the area around Toutens. The château at Toutens was burned and razed.

The present-day château was likely built in the early to mid-18th century by the De Ver family using some of the stone and other material from their feudal château but on another site some 300 metres to the west of the former site.

Demographics

See also
Communes of the Haute-Garonne department

References

Communes of Haute-Garonne